Dagana Department may refer to:
Dagana Department, Senegal
Dagana Department, Chad

Department name disambiguation pages